Methyl formate, also called methyl methanoate, is the methyl ester of formic acid. The simplest example of an ester, it is a colorless liquid with an ethereal odour, high vapor pressure, and low surface tension.  It is a precursor to many other compounds of commercial interest.

Production
In the laboratory, methyl formate can be produced by the condensation reaction of methanol and formic acid, as follows:

HCOOH + CH3OH  →  HCOOCH3 + H2O

Industrial methyl formate, however, is usually produced by the combination of methanol and carbon monoxide (carbonylation) in the presence of a strong base, such as sodium methoxide:

This process, practiced commercially by BASF among other companies gives 96% selectivity toward methyl formate.  The catalyst for this process is sensitive to water, which can be present in the carbon monoxide feedstock, which is commonly derived from synthesis gas. Very dry carbon monoxide is, therefore, essential.

Uses
Methyl formate is used primarily to manufacture formamide, dimethylformamide, and formic acid.  These compounds are precursors or building blocks for many useful derivatives.

Because of its high vapor pressure, it is used for quick-drying finishes and as a blowing agent for some polyurethane foam applications and as a replacement for CFCs, HCFCs, and HFCs.  Methyl formate has zero ozone depletion potential and zero global warming potential. It is also used as an insecticide.

A historical use of methyl formate, which sometimes brings it attention, was in refrigeration.  Before the introduction of less-toxic refrigerants, methyl formate was used as an alternative to sulfur dioxide in domestic refrigerators, such as some models of the famous GE Monitor Top.

References

External links
 NIST Chemistry WebBook: Methyl formate
 ChemicalLand21.com entry on METHYL FORMATE
 CDC - NIOSH Pocket Guide to Chemical Hazards

Formate esters
Methyl esters